Satu Karoliina Lundahl, née Leppäluoto (born 30 June 1968 in Helsinki) is a retired female weightlifter from Finland, who was nicknamed "Kartsi" during her career. She started as a shot putter, competing for her native country at the 1996 Summer Olympics.

Lundahl won the Finnish championships in 1994, 1996 and 1998.

Lundahl later started a career in weightlifting, winning the gold medal at the 1998 World Weightlifting Championships in Lahti. She also competed in this discipline at the 2000 Summer Olympics in Sydney, Australia.

References

1968 births
Living people
Sportspeople from Helsinki
Finnish female shot putters
Finnish female weightlifters
Athletes (track and field) at the 1996 Summer Olympics
Weightlifters at the 2000 Summer Olympics
Olympic weightlifters of Finland
Olympic athletes of Finland
European Weightlifting Championships medalists
World Weightlifting Championships medalists
20th-century Finnish women
21st-century Finnish women